Jorge Enrique Amaya Villalobos (born 9 October 1952) is a Chilean football manager and former footballer who played as a midfielder.

Career
A midfielder, Amaya played for Naval, O'Higgins and Universidad Católica in his homeland. Abroad, he played for Luis Ángel Firpo in the Salvadoran top division.

A football manager who graduated in 1989, he has mainly worked in Paraguay. As assistant, he has served in clubs such as Cerro Porteño, Libertad and Rubio Ñu. As coach, he has worked for the reserves of Club Nacional, Rubio Ñu, 12 de Octubre, Sol de América and Olimpia. As head coach, he has worked for Atlántida, Tacuary and Sport Colombia as well as the Caaguazú city team.

In his homeland, he had a stint in the Colo-Colo youth ranks in 1995 alongside Oscar Paulín.

In Indonesia, he had stints with Persekabpas Pasuruan in 2007, coinciding with his compatriot Francisco Rotunno as player, and PSIR Rembang in 2011.

References

External links
 Jorge Amaya at PlaymakerStats.com
 

1952 births
Living people
Footballers from Santiago
Chilean footballers
Chilean expatriate footballers
Chilean Primera División players

Naval de Talcahuano footballers
O'Higgins F.C. footballers
Club Deportivo Universidad Católica footballers
Salvadoran Primera División players
C.D. Luis Ángel Firpo footballers
Chilean expatriate sportspeople in El Salvador
Expatriate footballers in El Salvador
Association football midfielders
Chilean football managers
Chilean expatriate football managers
Club Tacuary managers
Paraguayan Primera División managers
Chilean expatriate sportspeople in Paraguay
Chilean expatriate sportspeople in Mexico
Chilean expatriate sportspeople in Indonesia
Expatriate football managers in Paraguay
Expatriate football managers in Mexico
Expatriate football managers in Indonesia